Senator Gross may refer to:

Chuck Gross (born 1958), Missouri State Senate
Jacob A. Gross (1842–1887), New York State Senate
Jen Gross (fl. 2010s), Montana State Senate
Samuel Gross (politician) (1776–1839), Pennsylvania

See also
William Grose (1812–1900), Indiana State Senate